John Garvey (born March 26, 1969 in Guilford, Connecticut) is a retired American soccer player.

Career

College
Garvey played college soccer at the University of Maryland from 1987 to 1990.

Professional
In 1991, following his graduation from Maryland, Garvey had a trial with Coventry City but was not offered a contract. He returned to the United States and signed with the Miami Freedom of the American Professional Soccer League. After eight games, he was traded to the Albany Capitals where he played in the 1991 APSL championship game.  In 1992, he moved to the San Francisco Bay Blackhawks of the A-League, and on November 7, 1992, he signed with the Milwaukee Wave of the National Professional Soccer League (NPSL) for the 1992-1993 winter indoor season.

In the spring of 1994, he joined the expansion Carolina Vipers of the Continental Indoor Soccer League for the summer indoor season before returning to the NPSL that fall, this time with the Wichita Wings. In the summer of 1995, he played outdoors with the Myrtle Beach Boyz of the USISL. The Boyz folded at the end of the season.  In June 1995, the Wings traded Garvey moved to the Tampa Bay Terror in exchange for Mike Britton. On January 17, 1996, the Terror traded Garvey to the Baltimore Spirit in exchange for Zak Ibsen.

On February 6, 1996, the Los Angeles Galaxy selected him in the 4th round (34th overall) in the 1996 MLS Inaugural Player Draft. He played thirteen games with the Galaxy during their debut 1996 season., before retiring from professional competition in 1997 at the age of 28.

International
In 1992 Garvey earned one cap, scoring one goal, with the U.S. National Futsal team.

Honors
Garvey was inducted into the Connecticut Soccer Hall of Fame in April 2014.

References

1969 births
Living people
American soccer players
Maryland Terrapins men's soccer players
American Professional Soccer League players
Miami Freedom players
Albany Capitals players
San Francisco Bay Blackhawks players
National Professional Soccer League (1984–2001) players
Major League Soccer players
Milwaukee Wave players
Tampa Bay Terror players
Wichita Wings (NPSL) players
Baltimore Spirit players
Continental Indoor Soccer League players
Carolina Vipers players
USISL players
Myrtle Beach Boyz players
LA Galaxy players
American men's futsal players
Association football forwards
Soccer players from Connecticut
People from Guilford, Connecticut